W. Maynard Pittendreigh is an astronomer, writer and an ordained minister in the Presbyterian Church (USA).  As a minister, he has been a pioneer and leader in a movement toward multi-cultural/racial congregations, and in developing early Internet-based ministries.

William Maynard Pittendreigh, Jr., was born in Greenwood, South Carolina, February 6, 1954, son of Bill and Earline Pittendreigh.  He suffered a severe speech handicap as a child, but was able to overcome the disability through surgery and several years of therapy.

Pittendreigh attended Christ Church Episcopal School, Greenville, South Carolina, Ware Shoals (SC) High School, and received his BA degree at Erskine College in Due West, South Carolina. He earned his Master of Divinity degree from Erskine Theological Seminary and his doctorate from Columbia Theological Seminary. He also attended Union Theological Seminary in Richmond, Virginia, where he earned a Certification as a Church Business Administrator.

Prior to entering the ministry, Pittendreigh worked as a photojournalist, restaurant manager and as a teacher/counselor in a state prison.  As a child he worked as a fashion model for J.C. Penney. As an ordained minister, he has worked as a police chaplain in Abbeville, South Carolina, as the Associate Executive Presbyter of Trinity Presbytery, as a religious technical advisor for several films, and as a member of the credentialed press for various religious publications including being the editor of the Church Ad-Ministrator Magazine.  He appeared in the 2008 Karl Bardosh film, "Out of Balance" and appeared in the credits as having played the character Peter Dray Maynard. He appeared in Simon Sort's 2019 film, "Rocket Boy," in which he played Rocket Man.

He is currently the senior pastor of Grace Covenant Presbyterian Church in Orlando, Florida.  In the past he has served congregations on Estero Island, Florida; Atlanta, Georgia, and a church in Miami, Florida.

Astronomy
Pittendreigh has been a lifelong active amateur astronomer and wrote several articles about astronomy in the United States and the United Kingdom. His work, "Pittendreigh's Law of Planetary Motion" was published in Sky and Telescope magazine in February 1994. During the early years of the Hubble Space Telescope, Pittendreigh was on an international team of amateur astronomers allowed to work with NASA in using the space telescope in a study of asteroids. The name of their study was "Transition Comets -- UV Search for OH Emissions in Asteroids."

Pittendreigh has long been active in the Astronomical League. He served as that organization's Executive Secretary since 2019, as the director of their annual convention in 2019, and is part of the five-member team of National Observing Program Directors.

Published works
Pittendreigh wrote several books, including: 
A History of Erskine Theological Seminary (1976)
A Presbyterian People - The History of the Warrenton Presbyterian Church (1986)
An Observer's Atlas to the Moon
A People of Faith - A History of New Bethel Presbyterian Church (1995)
The Presbyterian Church Welcomes You (2003) 
A Church for the Community (2010) 

Pittendreigh also wrote a humor column in the Clergy Journal for several years. He was editor of the Church Ad-Ministrator magazine from 1994 to 1998.

References

External links

 Sermons by Pittendreigh

1954 births
Living people
American Presbyterians
Presbyterian Church (USA) teaching elders
American astronomers
Erskine College alumni
People from Greenwood, South Carolina